The silver eel (Ariosoma mellissii), also known as the Melliss's conger, is an eel in the family Congridae (conger/garden eels). It was described by Albert Günther in 1870. It is a rare tropical, marine eel which is known solely from St. Helena, in the southeastern Atlantic Ocean. It is known to dwell at a maximum depth of 67 meters. Males can reach a maximum total length of 42.8 centimetres.

Named in honor of John Charles Melliss (1835-1911), amateur naturalist and government surveyor on St. Helena (island in the South Atlantic), who presented the type specimen to the British Museum (Natural History).

References

Ariosoma
Taxa named by Albert Günther
Fish described in 1870